The murder of Eliyahu Asheri was a terror attack which carried out on June 25, 2006, in which Palestinian Popular Resistance Committees (PRC) militants kidnapped, and later murdered the 18-year-old Israeli high school student Eliyahu Asheri.

The attack occurred only a few hours after the capture of Corporal Gilad Shalit that led to Operation Summer Rains.

Background

Eliyahu Pinchas Asheri (February 2, 1988 – June 25, 2006) was an Israeli student from the settlement of Itamar, in the northern West Bank. He was a student at the religious pre-army Mechina (preparatory program) "Elisha" in Neveh Tzuf. His father Yitro Asheri, originally from Adelaide, was converted by St Kilda's Rabbi Philip Heilbrunn in 1986. Yitro Asheri had moved from the Adelaide suburb of Glenelg to the Jewish centre of North Adelaide at the time of his conversion. About six months after his conversion he moved to Israel. He first settled in kibbutz Sde Eliyahu where he learned some Hebrew and later moved to a yeshiva headed by Rabbi Haim Druckman. The Asheri family were one of the founding members of Itamar and have lived there from 1991.

Kidnapping and murder
On Sunday, June 25, 2006, Eliyahu was kidnapped while on his way from Beitar Illit to Neveh Tzuf, northwest of Ramallah.

On Tuesday, June 27, 2006, Eliyahu's father, Yitro Asheri, initially submitted a missing-person report about his son to the Ariel Police. According to Yitro he did not report his son's absence for two days because Eliyahu used to regularly disappear for extended periods in the past without keeping daily contact with his parents.  Asheri was last seen on 9:00 pm Sunday night, after he left the home of a friend in Betar Illit and was hitchhiking near the French Hill intersection of Jerusalem by one of his classmates.

In addition, on Tuesday, the Palestinian militant group Popular Resistance Committees initially announced that the group has kidnapped a Jewish settler in the West Bank.

On Wednesday, June 28, Abu Abir, the spokesman for the Popular Resistance Committees, stated that Asheri would be "butchered in front of TV cameras" if Israel did not suspend its Operation Summer Rains into the Gaza Strip, which took place is in response to the kidnapping of Israel Defense Forces (IDF) corporal Gilad Shalit. Later on that day the Popular Resistance Committees stated that Asheri was slain.

Around 2:30 am on June 29, the IDF recovered the body of Asheri which had been buried in an open field near the village of Beitunia, not far from Ramallah. Asheri's body was later transferred to the Abu Kabir Forensic Institute for a forensic investigation. The forensic investigation revealed that Asheri was shot to death by a bullet to the head from close range, possibly the same day on which he was abducted. The IDF had been led to the site by the Palestinian militant Wasam Abu Ragila, who was a prime suspect of the murder of Asheri, who had been arrested on Wednesday by the Israeli police anti-terror unit and IDF troops and who confessed in his investigation about his part in the kidnapping and murder of Asheri and gave specific details about the location of Asheri's body.

Perpetrators
The Popular Resistance Committees claimed responsibility for the attack and presented Asheri's ID card. A Shin Bet investigation revealed that the abduction was carried out by a Tanzim terror cell connected with the PRC in Ramallah on instruction from the PRC leadership in Gaza.

Burial

Thousands attended Asheri's funeral which was held on the same day his body was found, during the afternoon hours on the Mount of Olives Jewish cemetery in Jerusalem. The Chief Sephardic Rabbi Shlomo Amar eulogized Asheri in his funeral.

Aftermath 
On the morning hours of 4 July 2006, during a joint operation conducted by the IDF and the Israel Security Authorities, the three Tanzim militants whom murdered Eliyahu Asheri and whom were hiding in the a Palestinian Police headquarters building in Ramallah, were apprehended after a three-hour standoff. The three men were Bassam Shafik Atiya Ahtiya, Khamze Salah Taktuk, and Ayham Fuab Nayef Kamamji. All three were reported to be members of the Al Aqsa Martyrs Brigades and had been serving in the security forces of the Palestinian Authority.
 
On 1 January 2007 Kamamji was sentenced to two life sentences for the murder of Eliyahu Asheri. In August 2021, he escaped from prison as part of the Gilboa Prison break but was recaptured two weeks later.

See also
2014 kidnapping and murder of Israeli teenagers
 Murder of Helena Rapp
 Murder of Shalhevet Pass
 Murder of Koby Mandell and Yosef Ishran
 Murder of Ofir Rahum
 Murder of Tali Hatuel and her four daughters

References

External links
 Palestinians: We kidnapped settler in West Bank - published on Ynetnews on June 26, 2006
 Militants hold second Israeli hostage - published on The Guardian on June 28, 2006
 Militants threaten to kill abducted settler - published on New York Times on June 28, 2006
 Seized Israeli settler found dead - published on BBC News on June 29, 2006

2006 deaths
Terrorist incidents in the West Bank in 2006
2006 crimes in the Palestinian territories
Kidnappings in the Palestinian territories
People murdered in the Palestinian territories
Terrorist incidents in the Palestinian territories
Terrorist attacks attributed to Palestinian militant groups
Israeli terrorism victims
Israeli people taken hostage
Israeli murder victims
Israeli casualties in the Second Intifada
Terrorism deaths in the West Bank
Deaths by firearm in the West Bank
2006 murders in Asia